Treva B. Lindsey is an American academic. She is Professor of Women’s, Gender, and Sexuality Studies at the Ohio State University and the author of Colored No More: Reinventing Black Womanhood in Washington D.C. (University of Illinois Press, 2017) and America Goddam: Violence, Black Women, and The Struggle for Justice (University of California Press, 2022).

Lindsey attended Oberlin College, graduating in 2004, then earned an MA (2006) and PhD (2010) from Duke University.

References

External links
 Conversation about America Goddam with Hanif Abdurraqib, April 7, 2022
 Conversation about America Goddam with Bettina L. Love, April 13, 2022

Living people
Oberlin College alumni
Duke University alumni
Ohio State University faculty
Year of birth missing (living people)